The White Hart is a grade II listed public house in South Mimms, Hertfordshire.

References

External links

Grade II listed pubs in Hertfordshire
South Mimms